British Aerospace Dynamics Limited (BADL or BAe Dynamics) was a division of British Aerospace.

History
British Aerospace was created in April 1977 by the merger of the British Aircraft Corporation, Hawker Siddeley Aviation, Hawker Siddeley Dynamics and Scottish Aviation.

Formation
There were two companies in the formation:
 BAC (Guided Weapons)
 Hawker Siddeley Dynamics

The missile, weapon systems and space businesses of these companies were merged into British Aerospace Dynamics Limited (BADL), a wholly owned subsidiary of BAe.

In December 1979, Euromissile Dynamics Group was formed with Aérospatiale of Toulouse, France and MBB of Ottobrunn.

Subsidiary company
On 1 January 1992, British Aerospace Defence Ltd began trading as a wholly owned subsidiary of BAe. Previously separate defence companies now operated as divisions of that subsidiary:
 British Aerospace (Dynamics) Ltd
 British Aerospace (Military Aircraft) Ltd,
 Royal Ordnance plc
 British Aerospace Systems and Services Division (BAe SSD)

In 1994, the BAe Dynamics subsidiary British Aerospace Space Systems was sold to Matra Marconi Space.

Merger with Matra
In 1996, BAe Dynamics' guided weapons division was merged with a division of Matra Defense to form the then largest European missile manufacturer, Matra BAe Dynamics. This group now forms part of MBDA.

Products

Missiles
 ALARM (missile), built with Marconi Space and Defence Systems
 Rapier (missile) SAM, designed earlier by BAC (Guided Weapons), and developed with Marconi Space and Defence Systems (the Blindfire radar), and was superior to the comparative Roland
 Sea Dart (missile), designed earlier by Hawker Siddeley Dynamics
 Sea Eagle (missile) ASM
 Sea Skua ASM
 Sea Wolf (missile) SAM
 Skyflash AAM
 Trigat

Satellites
 Giotto (spacecraft), approached Halley's Comet in March 1986 (made at Filton)
 Orbital Test Satellite
 Skynet (satellite), built with MSDS

References

BAE Systems subsidiaries and divisions
British companies established in 1977
Companies disestablished in 1996
Aerospace companies of the United Kingdom
Guided missile manufacturers
Spacecraft manufacturers
Space programme of the United Kingdom
1996 disestablishments in the United Kingdom